Dampierre-sur-Boutonne (literally Dampierre on Boutonne) is a commune in the Charente-Maritime department in southwestern France.

Geography
The village lies in the southwestern part of the commune, on the left bank of the Boutonne, which forms most of the commune's western border.

Population

See also
 Communes of the Charente-Maritime department

References

External links
 

Communes of Charente-Maritime
Charente-Maritime communes articles needing translation from French Wikipedia